The 1994 FA Women's Cup Final was the 24th final of the FA Women's Cup, England's primary cup competition for women's football teams. The showpiece event was played between Doncaster Belles and Knowsley United Women at Glanford Park in Scunthorpe on 24 April 1994. Knowsley United made its first final appearance, after losing the previous season's FA Women's Premier League Cup final at Wembley. Doncaster Belles entered their 11th final in 12 seasons, having won the trophy on five of those occasions.

Knowsley United entered the competition at the fourth round stage and beat Leyton Orient, Huddersfield Town, holders Arsenal and Stanton Rangers to reach the final. Doncaster Belles also entered at the fourth round and faced Millwall Lionesses, Bromley Borough, Brighton & Hove Albion and Leasowe Pacific before reaching the final. The Belles scored 25 goals and conceded two in their four matches.

Joy McQuiggan had joined Knowsley from Doncaster during the 1993–94 season. She had scored the winning goal for Leasowe Pacific in the 1989 final.

Watched by a crowd of 1,674, Doncaster won the match 1–0, with a goal by Karen Walker.

Match details

References

Cup
Women's FA Cup finals
Doncaster Rovers Belles L.F.C. matches
Liverpool L.F.C. matches